Rhynchodemus is a genus of land planarians in the tribe Rhynchodemini.

Description 
Species of the genus Rhynchodemus are characterized by an elongate body that is attenuated at both ends, oval or round in cross section. The creeping sole occupies most of the ventral surface and the anterior end has two large eyes. The copulatory apparatus has a large chamber with folded epithelium in the male atrium, without a penis papilla.

Species 
The genus Rhynchodemus includes the following species:

 Rhynchodemus americanus Hyman, 1943
 Rhynchodemus angustus (Hyman, 1941)
 Rhynchodemus aripensis Prudhoe, 1949
 Rhynchodemus blainvillei von Graff, 1899
 Rhynchodemus bromelicola de Beauchamp, 1912
 Rhynchodemus costaricensis de Beauchamp, 1913
 Rhynchodemus flavus Moseley, 1877
 Rhynchodemus fuscus Moseley, 1877
 Rhynchodemus graetzi du Bois-Reymond Marcus, 1953
 Rhynchodemus hectori von Graff, 1897
 Rhynchodemus ijimai Kaburaki, 1922
 Rhynchodemus inopinatus (de Beauchamp, 1930)
 Rhynchodemus marfa Marcus, 1953
 Rhynchodemus misus du Bois-Reymond Marcus, 1965
 Rhynchodemus nematopsis (de Beauchamp, 1930)
 Rhynchodemus oahuensis Hyman, 1939
 Rhynchodemus ochroleucus von Graff, 1899
 Rhynchodemus palnisius de Beauchamp, 1930
 Rhynchodemus piptus Marcus, 1952
 Rhynchodemus samperi Furhmann, 1912
 Rhynchodemus schmardai von Graff, 1899
 Rhynchodemus schubarti du Bois-Reymond Marcus, 1955
 Rhynchodemus scius du Bois-Reymond Marcus, 1955
 Rhynchodemus sumbawaeiensis (Hausler-Gamish, 1982)
 Rhynchodemus sylvaticus (Leidy, 1851)
 Rhynchodemus vejdovskyi von Graff, 1899

References 

Geoplanidae
Rhabditophora genera